Asopinae are a subfamily of stink bugs (family Pentatomidae). They are predatory stink bugs that are useful as biological control agents against pests, even against other Pentatomid species, which are all herbivorous.

Genera 

 Afrius (Syn. Subafrius)
 Alcaeorrhynchus Bergoth, 1891 (Syn. Mutyca)
 Amyotea
 Anasida
 Andrallus Bergroth, 1906 (Syn. Audinetia)
 Apateticus
 Apoecilus
 Arma Hahn, 1832
 Australojalla
 Blachia (Syn. Sesha)
 Brontocoris
 Bulbostethus
 Canthecona
 Cantheconidea
 Cazira (Syn. Acicazira, Breddiniella, Metacazira, Teratocazira)
 Cecyrina
 Cermatulus
 Colpothyreus
 Comperocoris
 Coryzorhaphis (Syn. Gilva)
 Damarius
 Dinorhynchus (Syn. Neoglypsus)
 Discocera (Syn. Acanthodiscocera, Paradiscocera)
 Dorycoris (Syn. Claudia)
 Ealda
 Eocanthecona
 Euthyrhynchus Dallas, 1851
 Friarius
 Glypsus (Syn. Cataglypsus, Epiglypsus, Paraglypsus)
 Hemallia (Syn. Allia)
 Heteroscelis (Syn. Agerrus, Bodetria, Heterosceloides)
 Hoploxys
 Jalla Hahn, 1832
 Jalloides
 Leptolobus (Syn. Moyara)
 Macrorhaphis Dallas, 1851
 Marmessulus (Syn. Marmessus)
 Martinia
 Martinina (Syn. Incitatus)
 Mecosoma
 Megarhaphis
 Mineus
 Montrouzieriellus (Syn. Acanthomera, Heteropus)
 Oechalia (Syn. Hawaiicola)
 Oplomus (Syn. Catostyrax, Polypoecilus, Stictocnemis)
 Ornithosoma
 Parajalla (Syn. Neojalla)
 Parealda
 Perillus Stål, 1862 (Syn. Gordonerius, Perilloides)
 Picromerus Amyot & Serville, 1843
 Pinthaeus Stål, 1867
 Planopsis
 Platynopiellus
 Platynopus
 Podisus Herrich-Schäffer, 1851 (Syn. Eupodisus, Telepta)
 Ponapea
 Pseudanasida
 Rhacognathus Fieber, 1860
 Stiretrus (Syn. Karaibocoris, Oncogaster, Stictocoris, Stictonotion, Stictonotus, Stiretroides, Stiretrosoma)
 Supputius Distant, 1889
 Troilus Stål, 1867
 Tylospilus Stål, 1870
 Tynacantha Dallas, 1851
 Tyrannocoris Thomas, 1992
 Zicrona Amyot & Serville, 1843

References

External links 
 
 Bibliography on Asopinae. Compiled by Prof. Dr. Patrick De Clercq, Ghent University.
 Fauna Europaea
 NCBI

 
Hemiptera subfamilies
Pentatomidae